Sample matrix inversion (or direct matrix inversion) is an algorithm that estimates weights of an array (adaptive filter) by replacing the correlation matrix  with its estimate.

where  is the conjugate transpose.

References
 
 

Covariance and correlation
Filter theory